
Gmina Sokółka is an urban-rural gmina (administrative district) in Sokółka County, Podlaskie Voivodeship, in north-eastern Poland, on the border with Belarus.

The gmina contains part of the protected area called Knyszyń Forest Landscape Park.

Villages
Apart from the town of Sokółka, Gmina Sokółka contains the villages and settlements of: 
 
 Bachmatówka
 Bilwinki
 Bobrowniki
 Bogusze
 Boguszowski Wygon
 Bohoniki
 Dąbrówka
 Drahle
 Dworzysk
 Geniusze
 Gilbowszczyzna
 Gliniszcze Małe
 Gliniszcze Wielkie
 Gnidzin
 Halańskie Ogrodniki
 Hałe
 Igryły
 Jałówka
 Janowszczyzna
 Jelenia Góra
 Kantorówka
 Karcze
 Kraśniany
 Kundzicze
 Kundzin
 Kundzin Kościelny
 Kurowszczyzna
 Kuryły
 Lebiedzin
 Lipina
 Lipowa Góra
 Malawicze Dolne
 Malawicze Górne
 Maślanka
 Mićkowa Hać
 Miejskie Nowiny
 Nomiki
 Nowa Kamionka
 Nowa Moczalnia
 Nowa Rozedranka
 Nowinka
 Orłowicze
 Ostrówek
 Pawełki
 Pawłowszczyzna
 Planteczka
 Plebanowce
 Podjałówka
 Podjanowszczyzna
 Podkamionka
 Podkantorówka
 Pogibło
 Polanki
 Poniatowicze
 Puciłki
 Ściebielec
 Sierbowce
 Słojniki
 Smolanka
 Sokolany
 Stara Kamionka
 Stara Moczalnia
 Stara Rozedranka
 Stary Szor
 Starzynka
 Stodolne
 Straż
 Szyndziel
 Szyszki
 Tartak
 Tatarszczyzna
 Wierzchjedlina
 Wierzchłowce
 Wilcza Jama
 Wojnachy
 Woroniany
 Wroczyńszczyzna
 Wysokie Laski
 Zadworzany
 Zamczysk
 Zaścianki (Bogusze)
 Zaścianki (Kurowszczyzna)
 Zaśpicze
 Zawistowszczyzna
 Żuki

Neighbouring gminas
Gmina Sokółka is bordered by the gminas of Czarna Białostocka, Janów, Kuźnica, Sidra, Supraśl and Szudziałowo. It also borders Belarus.

References
Polish official population figures 2006
 Agata Lewandowski, Łosośna - the Unknown Valley. Not the Last Arrival for…Puciłki, „Znad Wilii”, nr 3(79) z 2019 r., p. 58-64, (in Polish)http://www.znadwiliiwilno.lt/wp-content/uploads/2019/10/Znad-Wilii-3-79m-1.pdf

Sokolka
Sokółka County